The Schotten–Baumann reaction is a method to synthesize amides from amines and acid chlorides:

Schotten–Baumann reaction also refers to the conversion of acid chloride to esters. The reaction was first described in 1883 by German chemists Carl Schotten and Eugen Baumann.

The name "Schotten–Baumann reaction conditions" often indicate the use of a two-phase solvent system, consisting of water and an organic solvent. The base within the water phase neutralizes the acid, generated in the reaction, while the starting materials and product remain in the organic phase, often dichloromethane or diethyl ether.

Applications
The Schotten–Baumann reaction or reaction conditions are widely used in organic chemistry.

Examples:
 synthesis of N-vanillyl nonanamide, also known as synthetic capsaicin
 synthesis of benzamide from benzoyl chloride and a phenethylamine
 synthesis of flutamide, a nonsteroidal antiandrogen
 acylation of a benzylamine with acetyl chloride (acetic anhydride is an alternative)
in the Fischer peptide synthesis (Emil Fischer, 1903) an α-chloro acid chloride is condensed with the ester of an amino acid. The ester is then hydrolyzed and the acid converted to the acid chloride enabling the extension of the peptide chain by another unit. In a final step the chloride atom is replaced by an amino group completing the peptide synthesis.

Further reading

See also
 Lumière–Barbier method

References

Carbon-heteroatom bond forming reactions
Name reactions
Amide synthesis reactions
1883 in science
1883 in Germany